The  is an electric multiple unit (EMU) train type operated jointly by Central Japan Railway Company (JR Central) and West Japan Railway Company (JR-West) on the overnight Sunrise Izumo and Sunrise Seto limited express services in Japan. These EMUs were introduced from 10 July 1998 to replace ageing locomotive-hauled "Blue Train" coaches which once operated on separate Seto and Izumo services between Tokyo, Shikoku and the Sanin region.

Livery
The trains are finished in a livery of "Morning Glow" red and "Morning Mist" beige with "Sun Rise" gold lining.

Formations
, the fleet consists of five sets, numbered I1 to I5. I1 to I3 are owned by JR-West, and are classified 285-0 series. Sets I4 and I5 are owned by JR Central, and are classified 285-3000 series (the individual cars are numbered in the 3000 range). All sets, I1 to I5, are composed as follows, with two motored ("M") cars and five non-powered trailer ("T") cars. Car 7 and 14 is at the Tokyo (eastern) end.

The cars of JR Central sets I4 and I5 are numbered in the -3000 series. The motor cars are each fitted with one WPS28A single-arm pantograph. The motor cars in sets I1 and I3 each have two.

Interior
Each car includes toilet facilities.

Fleet details
The individual build details of the fleet are as shown below.

History
The trains entered service on 10 July 1998, with set I4 forming the down Sunrise Izumo, set I5 forming the down Sunrise Seto, set I3 forming the up Sunrise Izumo, and set I2 forming the up Sunrise Seto.

See also
 583 series, the first Japanese sleeping-car EMU type

References

External links

 JR Central 285 series 

Electric multiple units of Japan
Train-related introductions in 1998
Double-decker EMUs
Kawasaki multiple units
Nippon Sharyo multiple units
Kinki Sharyo multiple units
1500 V DC multiple units of Japan